The Gambier Group is an Early Cretaceous aged geologic group in the southern Coast Mountains of British Columbia, Canada. It was formed on the easternmost point of the Wrangellia Terrane as a volcanic arc about 100 million years ago along a west-to southwest-dipping subduction zone. This prehistoric volcanic arc is generally referred to as the Gambier arc or Gambier volcanic arc.

See also
Volcanism of Western Canada
Flute Summit
Piccolo Summit
Whistler Mountain

References

Volcanism of British Columbia
Cretaceous volcanism
Volcanic arcs
Volcanic groups